Manifestation (or manifesting) refers to various pseudoscientific self-help strategies that can purportedly make an individual's wishes come true by mentally visualizing them. Manifestation techniques are based on the law of attraction of New Thought spirituality. While the process involves positive thinking, or even directing requests to "the universe", it also involves actions on the part of the individual.

Manifesting has been criticised as having no basis in physical science. Alison Bernstein, a professor of translational neuroscience at Michigan State University said in an interview with Vice that "You can’t magically make things happen. You can [however] change the way you react to certain situations, which sounds to me like Cognitive Behavioral Therapy". She went on to assert that "manifestation is not supported by science".

History 

The practice was popularized by the film The Secret (2006) and a book of the same name by Rhonda Byrne. It has been popularized on social media since the 2010s. It is promoted by Oprah Winfrey, Deepak Chopra, Eckhart Tolle, Gabrielle Bernstein, and Iyanla Vanzant, among others.

References 

Popular psychology